William Beynon (1888–1958) was a Canadian Tsimshian Nation chief and oral historian.

William Beynon may also refer to:

Sir William Beynon (Indian Army officer) (1866–1955), British Indian Army general
William Addison Beynon (1877–1968), Canadian politician and barrister
Sir Granville Beynon (William John Granville Beynon, 1914–1996), British physicist

See also
William Benyon (disambiguation)